Nicola Manzari (14 November 1908 – 28 April 1991) was an Italian screenwriter and director. He wrote for 38 films between 1940 and 1975.

Selected filmography
 The Adventures of Fra Diavolo (1942)
 Chains (1949)
 Hearts at Sea (1950)
 Women and Brigands (1950)
 Cameriera bella presenza offresi... (1951)
 The Last Sentence (1951)
 I morti non pagano tasse (1952)
 Non è vero... ma ci credo (1953)
 Frine, Courtesan of Orient (1953)
 Lulu (1953)
 Papà Pacifico (1954)
 Love Song (1954)
 Le ambiziose (1961)
 Mafia Connection (1970)

References

External links

1908 births
1991 deaths
20th-century Italian screenwriters
Italian male screenwriters
20th-century Italian male writers